Expanathuridae is a family of crustaceans belonging to the order Isopoda.

Genera:
 Coralanthura Poore & Kensley, 1981
 Eisothistos Haswell, 1884
 Expanathura Wägele, 1981
 Heptanthura Kensley, 1978
 Minyanthura Kensley, 1982
 Panathura Barnard, 1925
 Rhiganthura Kensley, 1978

References

Isopoda